Stanislaw Eduardavich Drahun (born 4 June 1988) is a Belarusian professional footballer who plays for BATE Borisov.

Career
Drahun was a member of the Belarus U21 that finished in 3rd place at the 2011 UEFA European Under-21 Football Championship. He played in all five of the matches and earned a penalty for his team (which was converted by Andrei Voronkov) in the 2:0 group stage win against Iceland U21.  On 10 August 2011, Drahun made his senior side debut in the 1:0 win against Bulgaria in an exhibition match. He also played for the Belarus Olympic team that participated in the 2012 Toulon Tournament, appearing in all three of their matches and scoring one goal (versus France Olympic team), while also receiving a red card in the game against Mexico Olympic team.  He competed at the 2012 Summer Olympics as one of Belarus's 3 allowed over-23 players. On 14 February 2019, Drahun scored the winning goal in the first leg of a UEFA Europa League knockout round tie with Arsenal that finished 1–0.

Career statistics

International
Scores and results list Belarus' goal tally first.

Honours
BATE Borisov
Belarusian Premier League: 2017, 2018
Belarusian Cup: 2019–20, 2020–21
Belarusian Super Cup winner: 2022

Belarus U21
UEFA European Under-21 Championship bronze: 2011

References

External links
 
 

1988 births
Living people
Footballers from Minsk
Belarusian footballers
Association football midfielders
Olympic footballers of Belarus
Footballers at the 2012 Summer Olympics
Belarus international footballers
Belarusian expatriate footballers
Expatriate footballers in Russia
Russian Premier League players
FC SKVICH Minsk players
FC Gomel players
FC Dinamo Minsk players
PFC Krylia Sovetov Samara players
FC Dynamo Moscow players
FC Orenburg players
FC BATE Borisov players